"All the Man That I Need" is a song written by Dean Pitchford and Michael Gore. The song was first recorded as "All the Man I Need" by Linda Clifford for her album I'll Keep on Loving You (1982). In 1990, American singer Whitney Houston had a number-one multiple chart hit with this song, recorded as "All the Man That I Need", from her third album, I'm Your Baby Tonight (1990). 

Houston's version was released as the album's second single on December 4, 1990 by Arista Records. Her version featured production from Narada Michael Walden and the single became a major worldwide hit, received mainly positive reviews from music critics, and reached number one on the US Billboard Hot 100; it remains her fourth biggest-hit in that chart.

Background
"All the Man That I Need" was originally written in 1981, by Dean Pitchford and Michael Gore. They had Linda Clifford in mind when they wrote the song, having written the song "Red Light" from Fame for her in 1980. Clifford recorded her version of the song, "All the Man I Need," for her 1982 album I'll Keep on Loving You. She released it as a single, but it failed to chart.

Pitchford later stated that although different versions of the song were recorded, no one was scoring a major hit with it: "I figured that it was one of those songs that was going to get cut a number of times and not ever have its day," he said. During a dinner with Arista Records' president Clive Davis, the song came up and Davis asked Pitchford to send him a demo. Davis had just finished working with Whitney Houston as the executive producer of her second album, Whitney (1987). 

Although he was impressed by the song, he felt they would be unable to do anything with it at that time as Houston had only just finished recording an album, so it would be some time before she would be returning to the studio. During this period, Pitchford's publishers received several requests from other artists wishing to record the song. Houston eventually recorded it for the album I'm Your Baby Tonight (1990).

Composition

"All the Man That I Need" is an R&B song. According to the sheet music published at Musicnotes.com by Alfred Music Publishing, the song is written in the key of F minor with a key change to the key of F-sharp minor. The beat is set in common time, and moves at a slow tempo of 76 beats per minute. It has the sequence of Bm–Fm–E–E/D–D–Cm7 as its chord progression. Houston's vocals in the song span from the note of C4 to the note of A5, while the piano elements range from the note of B1 to the high note of F5 . Stephen Holden of The New York Times, wrote that the song was an "expression of sexual hero worship." The song also features a saxophone solo by American recording artist Kenny G.

Chart performance
Released in December 1990, "All the Man That I Need" entered the Billboard Hot 100 Singles chart at number 53, the issue dated December 22, 1990. Ten weeks later, on the issue dated February 23, 1991, it ascended to the top of the chart, becoming Houston's ninth number-one on the chart. It stayed atop the chart for two weeks. It also topped the Hot 100 Singles Sales and Hot 100 Airplay charts, her first song to achieve this feat since "Where Do Broken Hearts Go" in 1988. It enjoyed a seven week run in the top ten of the chart, which was one week shorter than that of the album's lead single "I'm Your Baby Tonight." The song also helped Houston in becoming the first and only artist to launch multiple number one singles off their first three albums. The single entered the Billboard Hot R&B/Hip-Hop Songs (formerly Hot R&B Singles) at number 58, the same week it debuted on the Hot 100. It later peaked at number one on the chart, the issue date of March 2, 1991, making it Houston's fifth R&B number-one hit. When it hit the pole position of the R&B chart, the single spent its second and third week at the top of the Hot 100 and Hot Adult Contemporary charts, respectively. As a result, it became her first single topped simultaneously all of three different Billboard charts — the Hot 100, Hot R&B, and Hot Adult Contemporary — and overall the third triple-crown hit, after 1985's "Saving All My Love for You" and 1986's "How Will I Know," reached the top spot on those of three charts in separate weeks. The song maintained the top position of the Adult Contemporary chart for four weeks, her second-longest stay on the chart. It was ranked number 16 on the Billboard Hot 100 Year-End chart for 1991. The single was certified Gold by the Recording Industry Association of America (RIAA) for shipments of 500,000 copies or more on March 21, 1991. In Canada, the song debuted at 90 on the RPM Top 100 Hit Tracks chart. Seven weeks later, it peaked at number one on the chart and stayed there for a week.

Internationally, the song experienced some success. It went to number-one in Canada. It entered the UK Singles Chart at number 27, the week ending date of December 22, 1990, and peaked at number 13 on January 19, 1991, in that country. According to The Official Charts Company, the single has sold 120,000 copies in the United Kingdom. It also reached number 16 in Ireland, 11 in Netherlands, 21 in Austria, and 28 in France. The song also peaked at number 37 in Germany, 36 in New Zealand, and 28 in Switzerland.

Awards
"All the Man That I Need" was nominated for "Best Pop Vocal Performance, Female," Houston's fifth nomination for the category, at the 34th Grammy Awards on February 26, 1992. The song was also nominated for "Best R&B/Soul Single, Female" at the 6th Soul Train Music Awards on March 10, 1992.

Critical reception
"All the Man That I Need" garnered mainly positive reviews from music critics. Larry Flick from Billboard complimented it as a "shimmering jazz-and gospel-inflected ballad", and stated that it "fully demonstrates Houston's vocal beauty". Greg Kot of Chicago Tribune was also positive in his review, writing that through the song, Houston was providing "soundtrack to a million love affairs." A reviewer from Melody Maker said, "She really sounds as if she means it and the chorus is more than suitably sumptuous and soaring and shouty so it really ought to be Number One all over the world by Chrimbo." Pan-European magazine Music & Media declared the song as a "staggering gospel-tinged ballad with an overwhelming build-up in the chorus." A reviewer from Music Week commented, "Another sterling performance from Whitney, on a slightly sub-standard song. Nevertheless, a high chart placing seems inevitable." The New York Times Stephen Holden was also positive in his review, viewing the song as a "hunk of gargantuan pop bombast swathed in echo and glitzy astral twinkles." People Magazines editor described it as "an effective, down-tempo change of pace". James Hunter from Rolling Stone called it "an outsize ballad about poverty and damaged self-regard, so expertly that the song, with its effective whiff of Spanish guitar, stages undeniable pop drama."

Retrospective response
About.com ranked "All the Man That I Need" number four in their list of "Top 20 Best Whitney Houston Songs" in 2018, noting that it has "a prominent gospel choir in the final chorus." In an 2020 retrospective review, Matthew Hocter from Albumism described it as "a power ballad bringing some serious drama". AllMusic's Ashley S. Battel said that the song is one of "the two high points she does reach on this album [I'm Your Baby Tonight]", and added "the uplifting tale of another's love being enough to provide happiness in [the song]."

Music video
The accompanying music video for "All the Man That I Need" was directed by Peter Israelson. The video begins with Houston, donning a curly hairstyle, and wearing a black turtleneck, with her initials "WH" embroidered on it, standing against a wall in a house. She then moves forward in the room, and sits on a chair, singing her lines looking into the camera. The video then switches into another room in the house with all white furniture, including a bed, wardrobe, and grand piano, in which Houston sings. She then moves outside on the balcony, where it is raining. After that scene, she is now seen performing, accompanied by a children's choir, on a stage, in front of an audience at some sort of program. The video ends with Houston finishing the performance, with her outline shown online.

Live performances

Houston performed the song on three of her regional and two world tours. She premiered the song in January 1990, during her Feels So Right Japan Tour, before the release of I'm Your Baby Tonight. The song was performed in 1991 in the Welcome Home Heroes with Whitney Houston concert, and is included on the concert film, taped in Norfolk, Virginia, on March 31, 1991. This performance was also included in the 2014 CD/DVD release, Whitney Houston Live: Her Greatest Performances.

The song was also performed on her third world tour, I'm Your Baby Tonight World Tour. Two different performances of the song on this tour were taped in Yokohama, Japan, on March 15, 1991 and in A Coruña, Spain, on September 29, 1991. The former was broadcast on Japanese TV channel. The latter was aired on Spanish TV channel, and in the United States, her first hourlong TV special, "Whitney Houston: This Is My Life," on ABC TV, dated May 6, 1992. 

Two years later on The Bodyguard World Tour (1993–94), she performed the song as a final part of "Love Medley," along with "I Love You," "All at Once," "Nobody Love Me Like You Do," "Didn't We Almost Have It All," and "Where Do Broken Hearts Go." Four different performances of the song were taped and broadcast on each country's TV channel during South American leg of the tour in 1994: Rio de Janeiro, Brazil, on January 16,  during Hollywood Rock festival; Santiago, Chile on April 14; Buenos Aires, Argentina on April 16; and Caracas, Venezuela on April 21. Houston also performed the song on two of her regional tours, The Pacific Rim Tour (1997) and The European Tour (1998).

Besides her tour performances of the song, she performed the song on various TV shows and the concerts. On December 11, 1990, Houston appeared on The Tonight Show Starring Johnny Carson (guest host: Jay Leno) and performed the song to accompaniment of her tour band. She also performed the song at The Arsenio Hall Show, and Saturday Night Live on February 23, 1991, which was her first appearance on the show.

"All the Man That I Need" was performed as a part of medley by Houston at the 2nd Billboard Music Awards on December 9, 1991. The medley consisted of two Billie Holiday's classics―"Lover Man (Oh, Where Can You Be?)" and "My Man"―and the song. In 1996, she performed the song at  Brunei: The Royal Wedding Celebration, a private gig for the wedding of Princess Rashidah, the eldest daughter of the Sultan of Brunei, Hassanal Bolkiah.

Covers
In 1982, the American musical group Sister Sledge recorded another version of the song as "All the Man I Need" as a duet with the singer David Simmons, on the Sister Sledge album 'The Sisters' (1982). Their version failed to make a large impact on the Billboard Hot 100, but reached a moderate peak of number forty-five on the [[Hot R&B/Hip-Hop Songs|''Billboards Hot R&B Singles]] chart.

In 1994, Luther Vandross (who made the arrangements of the original Linda Clifford version) included his own version, "All the Woman I Need" on his album Songs. He  performed the song at the 2001 BET Awards, in honor of Houston.

Track listing and formats
GER Maxi-Single
 "All the Man That I Need" — 4:11
 "Dancin' on the Smooth Edge" — 5:50
 "Greatest Love of All (Live) — 7:30

US CD-Single
 "All the Man That I Need" — 4:11

Credits and personnel"All the Man That I Need"Dean Pitchford – writer
Michael Gore – writer
Narada Michael Walden – producer, arranger
Whitney Houston – vocals
Walter Afanasieff – keyboards, Moog bass, drum programming, synthesizer
Louis Biancaniello – additional keyboards, drum programming, additional programming
Ren Klyce – Fairlight synth programming
Chris Camozzi – guitar
Kenny G – tenor saxophone
Claytoven Richardson – backing vocals
Karen "Kitty Beethoven" Brewington – backing vocals
Skyler Jett – backing vocals
Annie Stockin – backing vocals
Jeanie Tracy – backing vocals
Melisa Kary – backing vocals"Dancin' on the Smooth Edge'''"
David Lasley – writer
Robbie Long – writer
Whitney Houston – vocals
Narada Michael Walden – producer, arranger
Walter Afanasieff – associate producer, keyboards, Moog bass, drum programming, synthesizer
Louis Biancaniello – additional keyboards, drum programming, additional programming
Ren Klyce – Fairlight synth programming
Chris Camozzi – guitar
Vernon "Ice" Black – guitar
Claytoven Richardson – backing vocals
Karen "Kitty Beethoven" Brewington – backing vocals
Skyler Jett – backing vocals
Annie Stockin – backing vocals
Jeanie Tracy – backing vocals
Melisa Kary – backing vocals

Charts and certifications

Weekly charts

Year-end charts

All-time charts

Certifications

See also
List of RPM number-one singles of 1991
List of Hot 100 number-one singles of 1991 (U.S.)
List of Hot Adult Contemporary number ones of 1991
List of number-one R&B singles of 1991 (U.S.)

References

Bibliography

External links
 All the Man That I Need at Discogs
 
 

1981 songs
1990s ballads
Sister Sledge songs
Whitney Houston songs
Billboard Hot 100 number-one singles
Cashbox number-one singles
Number-one singles in Zimbabwe
RPM Top Singles number-one singles
Songs written by Dean Pitchford
Contemporary R&B ballads
Pop ballads
Song recordings produced by Narada Michael Walden
Songs with music by Michael Gore
1990 singles
Arista Records singles
Soul ballads